Jayaraj Vijay is an Indian film director who is primarily working in Malayalam-language films. He made his debut with  Shudharil Shudhan starring Indrans in the lead role, while his second release Money Back Policy had Sreenivasan as the lead actor.

In 2015, he had a successful outing with Shine Tom Chacko and veteran actor Shankar with Vishwasam... Athallae Ellaam.

Jayaraj Vijay won the 2016 Best Screenplay Kerala State Television Award for Pokkuveyil (TV series).

Career 
Jayaraj Vijay started his film career as scriptwriter for the unreleased film Priyam Priyankaram(2000), where he worked as the assistant director as well. Then he became the writer for the highly successful TV series Detective Anand. He also wrote many series like Oppol, Kaanakkinavu, Kanyadhaanam and Indraneelam for Surya TV. His other works includes Mounanombaram, (Kairali TV), Nirmalyam (Asianet), Sasneham (Amrita TV) and Indira in Mazhavil Manorama. He has also directed many advertisements as well as special programme for several TV Channels before his debut release Shudharil Shudhan.

Jayaraj Vijay has also directed a serial Avaril Oraal for Surya TV, story by Bobby–Sanjay and produced by Listin Stephen.

Filmography

References

External links 
 

Living people
Film directors from Kochi
Year of birth missing (living people)
Malayalam film directors
People from Ernakulam district
Malayali people
Kerala State Television Award winners